Kaigutsi is a village in Hiiumaa Parish, Hiiu County in northwestern Estonia.

The village is first mentioned in 1591 (Kaickotz). Historically, the village was part of Käina Church Manor.

References
 

Villages in Hiiu County